The Illustrated Biographies of the Great Artists was a book series in 38 volumes edited by Joseph Cundall and his son Frank, and published by Sampson Low, Marston, Searle, and Rivington in London from 1879 to the 1890s.

Volumes
Incomplete list of volumes:
 Claude Le Lorrain, by Owen J. Dulles.
 Correggio, by M. E. Heaton.
 Della Robbia and Cellini
 Albrecht Dürer, by Richard Ford Heath, 1894.
 The Figure Painters of Holland, Ronald Gower.
 Fra Angelico, Masaccio, and Botticelli
 Fra Bartolommeo, Albertinelli, and Andrea del Sarto, by Leader Scott (the pseudonym of Lucy Baxter), 1881.
 Fra Giovanni Angelico Da Fiesole and The Early Florentine Painters of the Fifteenth Century. Catherine Mary Phillimore	
 Thomas Gainsborough, R. A, John Constable, R. A. by George M. Brock-Arnold
 Ghiberti and Donatello
 Angiolotto Bondone Called; Giotto, by Harry Quilter.
 Hans Holbein, by Joseph Cundall, 1892.
 Hogarth, by Henry Austin Dobson.
 Sir Edwin Landseer, by Frederic George Stephens.
 Lawrence and Romney, by Ronald Gower.
 Leonardo da Vinci
 Little Masters of Germany, by W. B. Scott.
 Mantegna and Francis
 Meissonier, by John W. Mollett.
 Michelangelo Buonarotti, by Charles Clémont.
 Murillo, by Ellen E. Minor.
 Overbeck, by J. Beavington Atkinson.
 Raphael, N. D'Anvers.
 Rembrandt, by J. W. Mollett. 1879
 Reynolds, by F. S. Pulling.
 Rubens, Charles William Kett.
 Tintoretto, by W. R. Osler.
 Titian, by Richard Ford Heath.
 J. M. W. Turner R.A., by W. Cosmo Monkhouse, 1879. 
 Van Dyck; Frans Hals of Haarlem, by Percy Rendell Head.
 Velázquez, by Edwin Stowe.
 Horace Vernet, Paul Delaroche, by J. Ruutz-Rees.
 Watteau, by J. W. Molett.
 Wilkie, by J. W. Mollett.

See also
 The Great Historic Galleries of England

References

Further reading
 Margaret M. Smith, "Joseph Cundall and the Binding Design for the Illustrated Biographies of the Great Artists", The Library, Vol. 5, No. 1 (March 2004). https://doi.org/10.1093/library/5.1.39

External links
https://www.publishinghistory.com/illustrated-biographies-great-artists-sampson-low.html

1880s books
Art history books
Series of non-fiction books
Sampson Low books